Crosswells Brewery was a brewery in Oldbury, then in Worcestershire, operational from the mid-19th century until 1914.

History

Walter Showell (born 1833) started his brewery company in the mid-19th century.  In 1866 he built a brewery over the Crosswell springs in Oldbury.  The brewery was successful, claiming its use of pure water direct from the springs helped its beer, and by the late 1880s the company was making profits of over £25,000 per year.

The company was sold in 1914 to Allsopp & Sons of Burton-upon-Trent, who supplied its ales to pubs tied to the Showell company.  The brewery was operated by Ind Coope and Wolverhampton & Dudley Brewery until 2006, the buildings then being sold for flats; they were however attacked by arsonists in 2009.

Football club

The brewery had a works cricket club, and from 1886 a football club, playing at the Langley Springs playing fields near the factory.  In its first season the club entered the FA Cup, as well as local tournaments such as the Walsall Cup and the Birmingham Junior Cup for non-senior sides.

The club may have been funded by the brewery as a rival to the nearby Mitchell St George's football club, which was backed by the Mitchells & Butlers brewery in Smethwick.  The club signed a number of players who had recently played for West Bromwich Albion and had them recognized by the Birmingham Football Association as amateurs.  This was in time for them to play in the Birmingham Senior Cup; the club had walked over Calthorpe in the first round, but lost 4-0 at Stoke in the second.

The move worked in the first round of the FA Cup, as the club surprisingly beat Burton Swifts away from home in the first round, scoring the only goal with a late rush through the posts right at the end of the match.  In the second round however the club was destroyed 14-0 by Wolverhampton Wanderers, the Wolves' record win, nine goals coming in the first half.

The club did recover quickly, gaining its own record win within the month by beating Dudley St Edmonds 23-0 in the Dudley Charity Cup.  The competition provided the club with a high note on which to finish the 1886-87 season, as the club beat Darlaston All Saints 2-0 in the final, having eliminated Walsall Swifts in the semi-final.

However nothing more is heard from the club, which did not enter any competitions in the following season.  The formation of Oldbury Town may have diverted support and effort, as, on the latter's foundation, it claimed already to have a number of playing members, and the brewery seems to have cavilled at paying professional players as the Football League became a reality.  The last reference to the club is a note that it had formally merged into Oldbury Town in September 1888.

Notable players

Jimmy Stanton and Fred Bunn, former West Bromwich Albion players who joined Oldbury Town in 1887

References

 Defunct breweries
 Defunct football clubs in the West Midlands (county)